Yueyang East railway station (Chinese: 岳阳东站) is a railway station located in Yueyanglou District, Yueyang, Hunan Province, China. It is on the Wuhan–Guangzhou high-speed railway, a segment of the Beijing–Guangzhou high-speed railway. The station opened in 2009. It is also the last station in Hunan before the train crosses the border to Hubei Province at Chibi North railway station.

External resources
A February 2011 photo of this station

Railway stations in Hubei
Railway stations in China opened in 2009
Stations on the Wuhan–Guangzhou High-Speed Railway